Finland entered the Eurovision Song Contest 1992 with "Yamma, yamma", sung by Pave Maijanen after they won the Finnish national final.

Before Eurovision

National final 
The Finnish broadcaster, Yleisradio Oy (YLE), held a national final to select the Finnish entry for the Eurovision Song Contest 1992, held in Malmö, Sweden. The contest was held at the Typhon Hall in Turku on 29 February, hosted by Kati Bergman. 10 songs competed, with the winner being decided through two rounds of jury voting, the first to select the top 4 songs, with the second selecting the winner.

The winner of the contest was Pave Maijanen with the song "Yamma, yamma", composed by Maijanen and written by Hector.

At Eurovision
Maijanen performed 12th on the night of the contest, following Iceland and preceding Switzerland. "Yamma, yamma" received 4 points, placing last of 23 countries competing.

Among the members of the Finnish jury was Vicky Rosti, who represented Finland in the 1987 contest.

Voting

References

External links
Finnish National Final 1992

1992
Countries in the Eurovision Song Contest 1992
Eurovision